Sculptures of Swedish rulers have been created since the 17th century. Most of the Swedish royal sculptures are located in Stockholm. Many of these can be seen in the city center around Stockholm Palace, in Gamla stan, Riddarholmen, Kungsträdgården and Stadshusterassen. Uppsala and Rottneros Park have three sculptures each. Gothenburg, Karlskrona, Örebro and Halmstad have two sculptures each.

List of sculptures

Photo gallery

References 

Cultural depictions of Swedish monarchs
Statues of monarchs